Traktor Ice Arena named after Valery Konsantinovich Belousov, commonly shortened to Traktor Ice Arena, is an indoor sporting arena located in Chelyabinsk, Russia. It is used for various indoor events and is the home arena of Traktor Chelyabinsk of the Kontinental Hockey League (KHL) and Belye Medvedi  of Junior Hockey League (MHL). The capacity of the arena is 7,500 spectators. It replaced Yunost Sport Palace as the home of Traktor. The arena is named after former Traktor head coach Valery Belousov.

Construction
The arena was designed by a Swedish company Skanska. Construction began in spring 2007 and was originally expected to finish by the 2008-09 season. But due to subsequent construction problems the official opening was rescheduled for January 2009. 

On 15 February 2013, the arena was damaged by the blast wave from the explosion of the Chelyabinsk meteor.

Events
2012 European Judo Championships
2012 KHL Junior Draft
2013 KHL All-Star Game
2013 Gagarin Cup Finals
2014 World Judo Championships
2015 World Taekwondo Championships

External links

Venue information

Indoor ice hockey venues in Russia
Indoor arenas in Russia
Traktor Chelyabinsk
Buildings and structures in Chelyabinsk Oblast
Kontinental Hockey League venues
Judo venues
Taekwondo venues